The Ministry of Long-Term Care is the Government of Ontario ministry responsible for administering the long-term care system and providing related services in the Canadian province of Ontario.

Services and programs
 Long-term care, including nursing homes.
 Home care

History
In the early years of Canadian Confederation, health was still considered primarily a municipal rather than provincial matter.  The Public Health Act of 1873 permitted the Lieutenant Governor to establish, by proclamation, a temporary "Central Board of Health" to deal with disease if it reached epidemic proportions. However, no proclamations were ever made, and a Central Board was never established.

The Provincial Board of Health was established on March 10, 1882, and it was charged with overseeing the many local health boards. It also assumed the responsibility of dealing with an epidemic, if one should arise. The board reported to the Lieutenant Governor (1882-1903), to the Provincial Secretary (1904-1918), then to the Department of Labour (1919-1924).

In 1924, the Provincial Board of Health was replaced by the Department of Health. In 1930, the department accepted from the Department of the Provincial Secretary the responsibilities for administering Ontario's psychiatric hospitals and inspecting the province's public and private hospitals. Also in 1930, the Department of Hospitals was established under the direction of the first Minister of Health; that department became a division of the Department of Health in 1934. In 1952, cancer research and the operation of cancer clinics was added to the department's responsibilities. Insured hospital services and insured physicians' services, introduced in 1959 and 1966 respectively, were combined under the Ontario Health Insurance Plan (OHIP) in 1972. The department also had responsibility over areas that are no longer associated with health, such as water and sewage functions (prior to 1957), mental retardation facilities and children's services (transferred to the Ministry of Community and Social Services in 1974), and occupational health (transferred to the Ministry of Labour in 1976).

In 1961, the Royal Commission on Health Services, chaired by Justice Emmett Matthew Hall, was appointed, which served as a catalyst for a major overhaul of the department.

In 1972, the Department of Health was renamed the Ministry of Health in a government-wide restructuring. In 1999, the Ministry of Health was renamed the Ministry of Health and Long-Term Care. On June 20, 2019, the Ministry of Health and Long-Term Care was split into the Ministry of Health and the Ministry of Long-Term Care.

List of Ministers

References

External links
 
 Ministry of Health and Long-Term Care organizational structure
 Health Quality Ontario website

Long-Term Care
1882 establishments in Ontario
Ambulance services in Canada
Medical and health organizations based in Ontario
Ministries established in 1882